Country song may refer to:
National anthem, known as a "country song" in some languages
"Country Song" (Jake Bugg song), a 2011 song by British singer songwriter Jake Bugg
"Country Song" (Pink Floyd song), an untitled song by Pink Floyd from their album Zabriskie Point
"Country Song" (Seether song), a 2011 single by Seether from their album Holding Onto Strings Better Left to Fray
Country music
Hot Country Songs, a chart of the most popular country music songs published weekly by Billboard magazine in the United States, sometimes simply referred to as "Country Songs"